George Carter Richardson (April 27, 1808 – May 20, 1886) was a Massachusetts politician who served as the Mayor of Cambridge, Massachusetts.

Personal life 
George was born to Jane Brown and Thomas Richardson. He was one of seven children. He married Susan Gore Moore on February 2, 1832, and stayed with her  until her death on November 18, 1845. After Susan's death, he married Ellen Gregory on November 5, 1850. He had four children in his first marriage to Susan, and one with Ellen. He died in Boston, Massachusetts on May 20, 1886.

References
Memorial biographies of New England Historic Genealogical Society. Vol. VIII, (1907).

Notes

1808 births
1886 deaths
Mayors of Cambridge, Massachusetts
Massachusetts city council members
People from Royalston, Massachusetts
19th-century American politicians